Laughter and Tears is a 1913 Swedish silent drama film directed by Victor Sjöström.

Cast
 Victor Lundberg as Drager
 Mia Hagman as Augusta
 Richard Lund as Arvid Drager
 Tutt Spångberg as Hilda, maid
 Hugo Björne as Larsson
 Justus Hagman as Ferdinand
 Agnes Öberg as Arvid's fiancée
 Erik Lindholm as Drager's manserver
 Stina Berg

References

External links

1913 films
1910s Swedish-language films
Swedish black-and-white films
1913 drama films
Swedish silent short films
Films directed by Victor Sjöström
1913 short films
Swedish drama films
Silent drama films